Frøken Kirkemus is a 1941 Danish family film directed by Lau Lauritzen Jr. and Alice O'Fredericks.

Cast
 Marguerite Viby as Frk. Eva Holm
 Poul Reumert as Direktør Thomas Berg
 Johannes Meyer as Obersten
 Ib Schønberg as Bogholder Blom
 Else Jarlbak as Lilli Lund
 Knud Rex as Berg junior
 Knud Heglund as Overtjener
 Buster Larsen as Frode
 Henry Nielsen as Nattevagt Andersen

External links

1941 films
1941 drama films
Danish drama films
1940s Danish-language films
Danish black-and-white films
Films directed by Lau Lauritzen Jr.
Films directed by Alice O'Fredericks
Danish films based on plays
Remakes of German films